Isileli J. Tuungafasi (born 10 January 1995) is a Tongan born New Zealand rugby union player who plays for  in the Bunnings NPC and  in Super Rugby. His playing position is prop. He is the brother of Ofa Tuungafasi, another rugby union player.

Career
Tuungafasi started his career playing for  playing 19 games across 3 seasons before he moved north to  where he played another 21 games. He was a late addition to the Crusaders squad for round 6 of the 2019 Super Rugby season. In 2020 he was named in the  squad. He moved Mitre 10 Cup teams again for the 2020 Mitre 10 Cup, this time to  making his debut for the Mako in Round 1 against . The Mako went on to win the premiership title in 2020 for the second time in a row. Tuungafasi played only 2 games for the Crusaders during the 2021 season due to strong performances by fellow props Joe Moody, George Bower and Tamaiti Williams.

Reference list

1995 births
New Zealand rugby union players
Living people
Rugby union props
Auckland rugby union players
Northland rugby union players
Crusaders (rugby union) players
Tasman rugby union players
People from Nukualofa
Moana Pasifika players